Wellborn is an unincorporated community in Suwannee County, Florida, United States. It also includes County Roads 137 and 250. Wellborn has a post office with ZIP code 32094.

References

External links

Unincorporated communities in Suwannee County, Florida
Unincorporated communities in Florida
Former municipalities in Florida